The Jessica Fletchers are a Norwegian indie-pop band, formed in Drammen (near Oslo) in 1997. The band is named after the Murder, She Wrote character Jessica Fletcher.

Discography

Albums 
 I Can Shoot You From Here (1997)
 What Happened To The? (2003)
 Less Sophistication (2005)
 You Spider (2007)

EPs
 Sorry About The Noise (2000)
 (Come On) It's Only Nine (2002)

Singles 
 "Bloody Seventies Love" (2004)
 "Summer Holiday & Me" (2005)

Members

Current members
 Thomas Innstø - lead vocals, guitar (founding member)
 Rune Somdal - lead guitar, backing vocals, percussion (founding member)
 Mats Asvald Innstø - keyboards, backing vocals, percussion (joined in 2003)
 Andreas Mastrup - bass, backing vocals (founding member)
 Jan Henning Sørensen - drums (joined in 2000)

Past members
 Vegard Syrstad - keyboards, percussion, backing vocals (1997–2002)
 Bjørn Rune Lie - drums, backing vocals (1997–2000)
 Ivar Chr. Johansen (also known as Ravi) - organ, piano, trumpet, percussion, backing vocals (2002–2003)

External links
 Official band homepage
 MySpace band page

Norwegian musical groups
Musical groups established in 1997
Musical groups from Drammen